is a former Japanese football player.

Playing career
Takahashi was born in Yachiyo on March 15, 1971. Through Chiba University, he joined Nissan Motors in 1991 and he played at reserve team. He moved to Urawa Reds in 1992. However he could not play in the match. He moved to Japan Football League club Brummell Sendai (later Vegalta Sendai) in 1996. He played many matches in 1996. Although he could hardly play in the match in 1997, his opportunity to play increased and he became a regular goalkeeper in 2000. In 2001, he played full time in all matches and the club was promoted to J1 League. He moved to Sagan Tosu in 2003. He moved to Chile and joined Unión San Felipe in 2004. In 2005, he returned to Japan and played for Tokushima Vortis until 2006. In 2007, he moved to Albirex Niigata Singapore. He retired end of 2008 season.

Club statistics

References

External links

1971 births
Living people
People from Yachiyo, Chiba
Chiba University alumni
Association football people from Chiba Prefecture
Japanese footballers
Japan Soccer League players
J1 League players
J2 League players
Japan Football League (1992–1998) players
Singapore Premier League players
Yokohama F. Marinos players
Urawa Red Diamonds players
Vegalta Sendai players
Sagan Tosu players
Tokushima Vortis players
Albirex Niigata Singapore FC players
Japanese expatriate footballers
Japanese expatriate sportspeople in Chile
Expatriate footballers in Chile
Expatriate footballers in Singapore
Japanese expatriate sportspeople in Cambodia
Association football goalkeepers